This page details Pittsburgh Steelers American football team and individual records ranging from most passing yards in a single season to all time coach winning percentages.

Individual single-season records
There's been a plethora of NFL players and a myriad of Pittsburgh Steelers players over the duration of its existence; these individuals happen to be the most successful...

Passing
Most attempts: 675 Ben Roethlisberger (2018)
Most completions: 452 Ben Roethlisberger (2018)
Most yards: 5,129 Ben Roethlisberger (2018)
Most touchdowns: 34 Ben Roethlisberger (2018)
Highest passer rating: 104.1 Ben Roethlisberger (2007)
Most touchdowns in two games: 12 Ben Roethlisberger (2014)

Rushing
Most attempts: 390 Barry Foster (1992)
Most yards: 1,690 Barry Foster (1992)
Most touchdowns: 14 Franco Harris (1976)
Most yards by rookie running back: 1200 Najee Harris (2021)

Receiving
Most receptions: 136 Antonio Brown (2015)
Most receiving yards: 1,834 Antonio Brown (2015)
Most receiving touchdowns: 15 Antonio Brown (2018)
Longest reception : 97T (twice) JuJu Smith-Schuster (2017 & 2018)

Defensive
Most tackles: 141 James Farrior (2003) 
Most sacks: 22.5 T. J. Watt (2021) 
Most interceptions: 11 Mel Blount (1975) 
Longest interception return: 96T Minkah Fitzpatrick (2019) 
Most safeties: 1 (multiple players)

Kicking
Most punts: 97 Mark Royals (1994) 
Most punt yards: 3944 Josh Miller (2000) 
Most field goals: 36 Chris Boswell (2021) 
Longest field goal: 59 Chris Boswell (2020)

Returning

Punt returns

Most punt return yards: 656 Louis Lipps (1984)
Most punt return touchdowns: 2 Antwaan Randle El (2003 & 2005), Louis Lipps (1985) and Ray Mathews (1952)
Longest punt return: 90 Brady Keys (1964)

Kick returns

Most kick return yards: 1466 Stefan Logan (2009)
Most kick return touchdowns: 2 Lynn Chandnois (1952)
Longest kick return: 101 Don McCall (1969)

Coaching
Most wins: 15 (16-game season) Bill Cowher (2004)

Miscellaneous
Most points scored: 142 Chris Boswell (2017)

Individual career-with-franchise records

There's been a plethora of NFL players and a myriad of Pittsburgh Steelers players over the duration of its existence; these individuals happen to be the most successful over the course of their career with the Steelers...

Passing leaders
Passing yards: 64,088 Ben Roethlisberger (2004–2021), 27,989 Terry Bradshaw (1970–1983), 13,328 Kordell Stewart (1995–2002), 12,867 Neil O'Donnell (1991–1995), 10,104 Bubby Brister (1986–1992)
Passing touchdowns: 418 Ben Roethlisberger (2004–2021), 212 Terry Bradshaw (1970–1983), 70 Kordell Stewart (1995–2002), 68 Neil O'Donnell (1991–1995), 66 Bobby Layne (1958–1962)

Rushing leaders

Rushing yards: 11,950 Franco Harris (1972–1983), 10,571 Jerome Bettis (1996–2005), 5,378 Willie Parker (2004–2009), 5,336 Le'Veon Bell (2013–2018), 4,381 John Henry Johnson (1960–1965) 
Rushing touchdowns: 91 Franco Harris (1972–1983), 78 Jerome Bettis (1996–2005), 35 Le'Veon Bell (2013–2018), 35 Kordell Stewart (1995–2002), 32 Terry Bradshaw (1970–1983)

Receiving leaders
Receiving touchdowns: 85 Hines Ward (1998–2011), 74 Antonio Brown (2010–2018), 63 John Stallworth (1974–87), 51 Lynn Swann (1974–82),  45 Heath Miller (2005–2016)
Receiving yards: 12,083 Hines Ward (1998–2011), 11,207 Antonio Brown (2010–2018), 8,723 John Stallworth (1974–87), 6,569 Heath Miller (2005–2016), 6,018 Louis Lipps (1984–91)
Receptions: 1,000 Hines Ward (1998–2011), 837 Antonio Brown (2010–2018), 592 Heath Miller (2005–2016), 537 John Stallworth (1974–87), 358 Louis Lipps (1984-91)

Defensive leaders

Tackles 740 James Farrior (2002–2011), 679 Lawrence Timmons (2007–2016), 677 Carnell Lake 1989–1998, 659 Greg Lloyd (1988–1997), 644 Rod Woodson (1987–1996), 639 Levon Kirkland (1992–2000), 583 Troy Polamalu (2003–2014), 564 James Harrison (2002–2017), 518 Ike Taylor (2003–2014), 448 Darren Perry (1992–1998)
Sacks: 80.5 James Harrison (2002–2017), 78.5 Cameron Heyward (2011–present), 78 L.C. Greenwood (1969–1981), 77.5 Joe Greene (1969–1981), 77.5 T. J. Watt (2017–present), 77 Jason Gildon (1994–2003), 60 Joey Porter (1999–2006), 59 Keith Willis (1981–1991), 57 Lamar Woodley (2007–2013), 55 Dwight White (1971–1980)
Interceptions: 57 Mel Blount (1970–1983), 52 Jack Butler (1951–1959), 51 Donnie Shell (1974–1987), 38 Rod Woodson (1987–1996), 37 Dwayne Woodruff (1979–1990), 36 Mike Wagner (1971–1980), 32 Jack Ham (1971–1982), Darren Perry (1992–1998) and Troy Polamalu (2003–2014), 28 Jack Lambert (1974–1984)

Kicking leaders

Field goals made: 309 Gary Anderson (1982–1994), 204 Jeff Reed (2002–2010), 202 Chris Boswell (2015–present), 146 Roy Gerela (1971–1978), 124 Shaun Suisham (2010–2015) 
50 yds+: 24 Chris Boswell (2015–present), 8 Gary Anderson (1982–1994) and Jeff Reed (2002–2010), 4 Kris Brown (1999–2001), 3 Shaun Suisham (2010–2015)

Returning

Punt returning

Most punt return yards: 2362 Rod Woodson (1987–1996), 1759 Antonio Brown (2010–2018), 1650 Antwaan Randle El (2002–2010), 1259 Theo Bell (1976–1980), 1212 Louis Lipps (1984–1991)
Most punt return touchdowns: 4 Antonio Brown (2010–2018) and Antwaan Randle El (2002–2010), 3 Louis Lipps (1984–1991) and Ray Mathews (1951–1959) and 2 Rod Woodson (1987–1996)

Kick returning

Most kick return yards: 4894 Rod Woodson (1987–1996), 2866 Larry Anderson (1978–1981), 2720 Lynn Chandnois (1950–1956), 2086 Dwight Stone (1987–1994), 1771 Will Blackwell (1997–2001)
Most kick return touchdowns: 3 Lynn Chandnois (1950–1956), 2 Rod Woodson (1987–1996) and Will Blackwell (1997–2001) and 13 other players have 1, the most recent being JuJu Smith-Schuster (2017–2021)

Coaching

Wins: 193 Chuck Noll (1969–1991), 163 Mike Tomlin (2007–present), 149 Bill Cowher (1992–2006) 
Win percentage: .636 Mike Tomlin (2007–present), .623 Bill Cowher (1992–2006), .591 Jock Sutherland (1946–1947) 
Playoff wins: 16 Chuck Noll (1969–1991), 12 Bill Cowher (1992–2006), 8 Mike Tomlin (2007-present) 
Most consecutive seasons .500 or above to start a career: 16 Mike Tomlin

Miscellaneous records

Most points scored: 1343 Gary Anderson (1982–1994), 919 Jeff Reed (2002–2010), 855 Chris Boswell (2015–present), 731 Roy Gerela (1971–1978), 600 Franco Harris (1972–1983)
Most games played: 249 Ben Roethlisberger (2004–2021), 220 Mike Webster (1974–1990) 217 Hines Ward (1998–20011), 201 Donnie Shell (1974–1987), 200 Mel Blount (1970–1983), 197 Gary Anderson (1982–1994)
Most touchdowns scored: 100 Franco Harris (1972–1983), 86 Hines Ward (1998–2011), 80 Jerome Bettis (1996–2005), 79 Antonio Brown (2010–2018), 64 John Stallworth (1974–1987)
Most two-point conversions made: 5 Hines Ward (1998–2011), 4 Antonio Brown (2010–2018), 3 Heath Miller (2005–2015) and Charles Johnson (1994–1998), 2 JuJu Smith-Schuster (2017–2021), James Conner (2017–2020), Mewelde Moore (2008–2011) and Markus Wheaton (2013–2016).

Team records

These are some of the best statistics put up by the Steelers...

1933–present
Most points scored in a season: 436 Steelers (2014 season), 428 Steelers (2018 season), 423 Steelers (2015 season), 416 Steelers (1979 season) and Steelers (2020 season)
Largest point differential in a season: 211 Steelers (1975 season), 204 Steelers (1979 season), 168 Steelers (1972 season), 161 Steelers (1978 season), 154 Steelers (1979 season)
Largest point deficit overcome in a game: 21 (Baltimore Ravens Oct. 5 1997), 21 (Buffalo Bills Dec. 15, 1985), 21 (Chicago Cardinals Oct. 11, 1953), 18 (Cincinnati Bengals Nov. 19, 1995) and 17 (Indianapolis Colts Dec. 27 2020)
Best W/L percentage against another team: .857 Carolina Panthers (6-1), .853 Atlanta Falcons (14-2-1), .818 Tampa Bay Buccaneers (9-2), .769 Indianapolis Colts (20-6), .750 New York Jets (18-6)

Individuals with NFL records

Offense

The following are records that are held by QB Ben Roethlisberger (2004–2021):

Most career 500-yard passing games: 4
Most completions in a regular or postseason game: 47
Most passing yards in a relief appearance: 379
Most passing yards in consecutive postseason games: 970
Most TD passes in a two-game span: 12
Only player with consecutive games of 6+ TD passes
Only player with consecutive postseason games of 4+ TD passes

The following are records that are held by FB Franco Harris (1972–1984):

Most career playoff touches: 451
Most career playoff rushing attempts: 400

Most receptions without a TD: 86 Diontae Johnson (2019-present)

Defense

Most INTs returned for TDs: 12 Rod Woodson (5 with Steelers, 5 with Ravens, 2 with Raiders)
Most sacks in one season: 22.5 T. J. Watt (tied with NFL Hall of Famer Michael Strahan)

Special teams

Most FGs in a single playoff game: 6 Chris Boswell

Coaching

Most consecutive seasons .500 or above to start an NFL career: 16 Mike Tomlin (2007–present)
Most consecutive Super Bowl wins: 2 (Twice) Chuck Noll (1974 and 1975, 1978 and 1979) (tied with Vince Lombardi, Don Shula, Jimmy Johnson, Mike Shanahan, and Bill Belichick) 
Most times winning consecutive Super Bowls: 2 Chuck Noll (1974 and 1975, 1978 and 1979)

Team NFL records

Single-season
 Second most games won (2004 tied) and third most games won in a season by a franchise (1978 tied).
 Most rushing TD's since merger (33 in 1976).
 Tied for most seasons with a player leading the NFL in sacks (2, T. J. Watt).
 Most AFC games with a 100+ yard rusher (Barry Foster, 1992)
 Highest passer rating and highest completion percentage by a rookie (Ben Roethlisberger, 2004)
 Most punt returns in a season (71 in 1976) and 2nd most punt returns in a season (67 in 1974).
 Tied for fewest fair catches in a season (0 in 1977).
 Tied for most opponent fumbles recovered by an AFC player (Jack Lambert, 1976).
 Tied for most touchdowns after fumble recovery (Jim Bradshaw, 1964).
 Most road wins in a season, postseason included (9 games, 2005).
 One of two sixth-seeded teams (along with the Green Bay Packers) to ever win the Super Bowl (Super Bowl XL).

All-time
 Most consecutive non-losing seasons to begin coaching career (16, Mike Tomlin)
 Most consecutive games with a sack (75).
 Tied (New England Patriots) most Super Bowl wins (six).
 Most conference championship games played in [AFC] (15 – all with AFC) – The San Francisco 49ers have most appearances with 16.
 Most conference championship games hosted [AFC or NFC] (8).
 Second most division titles won by any team in the history of the NFL (20 – second only to Dallas's 21) (all with AFC Central & North)
 Most post-merger regular season games won (486).
 Highest post-merger winning percentage [regular season & playoffs] (61.1%).
 Highest post-merger regular season winning percentage (61%).
 Quarterback with lowest interception percentage for a career (Neil O'Donnell)
 Most consecutive games with a touchdown reception among AFC teams (11) Buddy Dial, 1959–1960
 Most post-merger seasons leading league in fewest total yards allowed (5 tied).
 Most post-merger seasons leading league in fewest rushing yards allowed (6).
 Most seasons leading AFC in fewest passing yards allowed (6).
 Most post-merger seasons leading AFC in sacks (3).
 Player with most AFC games played, most NFL career points, most seasons with 100+ points, most FG attempts and FGs made (Gary Anderson).
 Player with most AFC interceptions and most NFL yards gained and most NFL touchdowns after interception (Rod Woodson).

References

Records
American football team records and statistics